Centennial College is a private degree-granting institute in Pokfulam, Hong Kong. The College was established by The University of Hong Kong as its second private subsidiary after the School of Professional and Continuing Education (SPACE). At present, the College is recognised as an Approved Post Secondary College under the Post Secondary Colleges Ordinance (Cap 320).

References

2012 establishments in Hong Kong
Educational institutions established in 2012
Universities and colleges in Hong Kong
Pok Fu Lam